This article shows all participating team squads at the 2010 Women's Pan-American Volleyball Cup, held from June 18 to 27, 2010 in Rosarito, and Tijuana, Mexico.

Head coach: Horacio Bastit

Head coach: Luizomar De Moura

Head coach: Arnd Ludwig

Head coach: Braulio Godínez

Head coach: Juan Carlos Gala

Head coach: Marcos Kwiek

Head coach: José A. Bernal

Head coach: Cheol Yong Kim

Head coach: Carlos Cardona

Head coach: Francisco Cruz Jiménez

Head coach: Hugh McCutcheon

References

External links
 NORCECA

P
P